John Allan Edward Siggins (28 June 1909 – 24 December 1995) was an Irish rugby union Number 8. Siggins played club rugby for Belfast Collegians, having attended Methodist College Belfast and played international rugby for Ireland captaining the national side on nine occasions between 1934 and 1936. In 1955 he was appointed manager of the British Isles team on their tour of South Africa.

Notes

References
 
 

1909 births
1995 deaths
Irish rugby union players
Ireland international rugby union players
People educated at Methodist College Belfast
Rugby union players from Belfast
Rugby union number eights